The 1916 Delaware gubernatorial election was held on November 7, 1916. Incumbent Republican Governor Charles R. Miller declined to run for re-election. At the time, the Republican Party was in the middle of a schism that had first developed during the 1912 presidential election. However, the schism did not affect the gubernatorial nomination; though there were rumors that the state party convention might seek to nominate Governor Miller for a second term, former State Representative John G. Townsend Jr. was seen as the frontrunner heading into the convention. He received the nomination without much difficulty and the Republican Party solidified around him its gubernatorial nominee. The Democratic Party nominated former Secretary of State James H. Hughes, and both Townsend and Hughes advanced to the general election.

Though President Woodrow Wilson had won Delaware in 1912 with a plurality, he narrowly lost it this year. Though the gubernatorial race was still close, Townsend outperformed Republican presidential nominee Charles Evans Hughes and defeated Hughs by a five-point margin, winning 52% of the vote to Hughes's 47%.

Both Townsend and Hughes would later serve in the United States Senate, and they would serve together as Delaware's two U.S Senators from 1937-1941. Townsend served from 1929-1941, while Hughes served from 1937-1943.

General election

References

Bibliography
 Delaware House Journal, 96th General Assembly, 1st Reg. Sess. (1917).

1916
Delaware
Gubernatorial
November 1916 events